The Susquehanna County Courthouse Complex, also known as Susquehanna County Courthouse & Jail, is a historic courthouse complex located at Montrose, Susquehanna County, Pennsylvania. The complex consists of four contributing buildings, one contributing site (the Town Green), and four contributing objects (an 1887 American Civil War memorial, a 1915 monument to Galusha A. Grow (1822-1903), an early surveyor's marker, and a 1930s Veterans' memorial).

The complex is located on a four-acre plot that was donated to Montrose for public use in 1853.   The original section of the courthouse was built in 1854-1855, and is a three bay by seven bay, two-story brick structure in the Greek Revival style.  It features a pedimented portico with fluted Ionic order columns and five bay arcade at the first level.  It has a shallow gable roof topped by an octagonal cupola. The building has been expanded five times; in 1883, 1902, 1950, 1954, and 1982.  The original jail was built in 1853, with a brick addition made in 1973.  It is a two-story, rectangular stone structure now known as the Susquehanna County Courthouse Annex.  Appended to the Annex is a two-story brick building built in 1925, and originally a part of a now demolished school.  The Jail of 1867-1868 is a three-story, stone building measuring 48 feet by 64 feet, and topped by a distinctive cupola.  It has a red brick extension with stone trim and flat-topped and rounded windows.

It was added to the National Register of Historic Places in 1996.

Gallery

See also
 List of state and county courthouses in Pennsylvania

References

County courthouses in Pennsylvania
Courthouses on the National Register of Historic Places in Pennsylvania
Greek Revival architecture in Pennsylvania
Residential buildings completed in 1854
Buildings and structures in Susquehanna County, Pennsylvania
1854 establishments in Pennsylvania
National Register of Historic Places in Susquehanna County, Pennsylvania